David Carrier Porcheron, also known as DCP, is a professional snowboarder from Quebec, Canada. He is the co-owner of YES Snowboards and known for his creative & smooth riding style.

Porcheron has been sponsored by Northwave/Drake and The North Face. He rode for Burton Snowboards for 14 years before being dropped from the team. He then started YES. with Romain de Marchi, JP Solberg and Tadashi Fuse. 

Porcheron is married to former pro snowboarder Megan Pischke. They have a daughter and a son.

References

Year of birth missing (living people)
Living people
Canadian male snowboarders